Sarah Smeyers (born 8 October 1980 in Aalst, East Flanders) is a Belgian politician as a member of the nationalist conservative party, the N-VA, representing Aalst in the Belgian Chamber of Representatives. She was first elected in 2007 and reelected in 2010. On 20 July 2010 she was elected as First Quaestor of the Chamber, responsible for the Chamber Budget.

Notes

1980 births
Living people
People from Aalst, Belgium
New Flemish Alliance politicians
Members of the Chamber of Representatives (Belgium)
21st-century Belgian politicians
21st-century Belgian women politicians